Take No Prisoners is the eleventh studio album by American singer-songwriter Peabo Bryson It was released by Elektra Records in June 1985 in the United States. Produced by Arif Mardin and Tommy LiPuma, the album peaked at number 102 on the US Billboard 200 and number 40 on the US R&B albums chart.

Three singles were released, including the title track and the pop crossover ballad "Love Always Finds a Way", the latter of which peaked at number 26 on the US Adult Contemporary chart in early 1986. The album's title track became a minor hit on both the pop and R&B charts, supported by a Miami Vice-inspired music video. In addition to Chaka Khan, contributing artists include Jennifer Holliday, Kashif and Robbie Buchanan.

Critical reception

In a retrospective review, William Ruhlmann of AllMusic found that Take No Prisoners "represented a missed opportunity for Bryson, even though he sang with his usual assurance, the material was of good quality, and the production was sympathetic."

Track listing

Personnel 
Musicians

 Robbie Buchanan – acoustic piano (1, 3, 7), synthesizers (1, 3, 5-9), programming (1, 3, 7), rhythm arrangements (1, 3, 5-9), keyboards (2, 5, 6, 8, 9), synthesizer programming (2)
 Philippe Saisse – additional synth solo (2), keyboards (4), synthesizers (4), programming (4), rhythm arrangements (4)
 Dann Huff – guitars
 Will Lee – bass (1)
 Marcus Miller – bass (3, 7)
 Anthony Jackson – bass (5, 6, 8, 9)
 Steve Ferrone – drums (1, 3, 4, 7, 8, 9), cymbal (2), tom-tom (2)
 Dave Weckl – drums (6)
 Lenny Castro – percussion (5, 8, 9)
 Ron Dover – saxophone (6)
 Arif Mardin – rhythm arrangements (2, 4)

Vocalist

 Peabo Bryson – lead vocals
 Erin Dickins – backing vocals (1, 2, 3, 7)
 Tommy Funderburk – backing vocals (1, 3, 7)
 Diva Gray – backing vocals (1, 2, 3, 7)
 Gordon Grody – backing vocals (1, 2, 3, 7)
 Tom Kelly – backing vocals (1, 3, 7)
 Edie Lehmann – backing vocals (1, 3, 7)
 Chaka Khan – backing vocals (2), rap (2)
 Mark Stevens – backing vocals (2)
 Kashif – backing vocals (4)
 Yolanda Lee Lewis – backing vocals (4)
 Brenda Nelson – backing vocals (4)
 Jennifer Holliday – backing vocals (5)
 Stephanie James – backing vocals (5)
 Michael Sembello – backing vocals (8)

Production

 Producers – Arif Mardin (Tracks 1-4 & 7); Tommy LiPuma (Tracks 5, 6, 8 & 9).
 Project Coordinator on Tracks 1-4 & 7 – Phillip Namanworth
 Music Contractor on Tracks 1-4 & 7 – Frank DeCaro
 Production Coordinator on Track 6 – Larry Fishman
 Engineers – Lew Hahn (Tracks 1-4 & 7); Ed Rak (Tracks 5, 8 & 9); Jay Rifkin (Track 6).
 Additional Engineers – Jerry Garcia, Jon Ingoldsby, Michael O'Reilly, Gary Skardina and Jeremy Smith (Tracks 1-4 & 7); Kevin Halpin  (Track 5); Mark Linett (Tracks 5 & 9); Erik Zobler (Track 6); Al Schmitt and Nick Spigel (Track 8). 
 Assistant Engineers – Jerry Garcia, Jon Ingoldsby and Michael O'Reilly (Tracks 1-4 & 7)
 Second Engineers – Gene Curtis (Tracks 5, 8 & 9); Leslie Klein (Track 5); Peggy McCreary and Garry Rindfuss (Track 6); Bud Rizzo and Steven Strassman (Track 8).
 Tracks 1-4 & 7 mixed by Lew Hahn at Atlantic Studios.
 Track 6 mixed by Bill Schnee at Bill Schnee Studio (Los Angeles, CA), assisted by Dan Garcia and Mike Ross.
 Mastered at Sterling Sound (New York, NY).
 Art Direction and Photography – Carol Friedman
 Design – Carin Goldberg
 Sleeve Notes – Peabo Bryson
 Management – David M. Franklin and Associates, Ed Howard and Skip Williams.

Charts

References

Peabo Bryson albums
1985 albums
Elektra Records albums
Albums produced by Arif Mardin
Albums produced by Tommy LiPuma